Le meilleur de Joe Dassin is a 1995 "greatest hits" album by Joe Dassin.

Track listing

2×CD version 
 Cat. nr. Columbia COL 480787 2 (Sony Music)

1×CD version 
 Cat. nr.: Columbia 481116 2 (Sony Music)

Charts

References

External links 
 Joe Dassin – Le meilleur de Joe Dassin on Discogs

1995 greatest hits albums
Joe Dassin albums
Sony Music albums